Poltava is a city located on the Vorskla River in central Ukraine. It is the capital city of Poltava Oblast (province) and of the surrounding Poltava Raion (district) of the oblast. Poltava is administratively incorporated as a city of oblast significance and does not belong to the raion. It has a population of

History

It is still unknown when Poltava was founded, although the town was not attested before 1174. However, for reasons unknown, municipal authorities chose to celebrate the city's 1100th anniversary in 1999. The settlement is indeed an old one, as archeologists unearthed a Paleolithic dwelling as well as Scythian remains within the city limits.

Middle Ages
The present name of the city is traditionally connected to the settlement Ltava which is mentioned in the Hypatian Chronicle in 1174. According to the chronicle, on Saint Peter's Day (12 July) of 1182, Igor Sviatoslavich, chasing hordes of the Cuman khans Konchak and Kobiak, crossed the Vorskla River near Ltava and moved towards Pereiaslav), where Igor's army was victorious over the Cumans. During the Mongol invasion of Rus' in 1238–39 many cities of the middle Dnipro region were destroyed, possibly including Ltava.

In the mid-14th century the region was part of the Duchy of Kyiv, which was a vassal of the Algirdas' Grand Duchy of Lithuania. According to the Russian historian Aleksandr Shennikov, the region around modern Poltava was a Cuman Duchy belonging to Mansur, who was a son of Mamai. Shennikov also claims that the Mansur Duchy joined the Grand Duchy of Lithuania as an associated state rather than a vassal state, and that the city of Poltava already existed at that time. In 1399, Mansur's army assisted the Grand Ducal Lithuanian Army in the battle of the Vorskla River, while a legend says that after the battle, the Cossack Mamay helped Vytautas to escape his death.

The city is mentioned for the first time under the name of Poltava no later than 1430. Supposedly, in 1430 the Lithuanian duke Vytautas gave the city, along with Glinsk (today a village near the city of Romny) and Glinitsa, to Murza Olexa (Loxada Mansurxanovich), who moved to the Grand Duchy of Lithuania from the Golden Horde. In 1430 Murza Olexa was baptized as Alexander Glinsky, who was a progenitor of the Glinsky family. According to Shenninkov, Alexander Glinsky must have been baptized in 1390 by Cyprian, Metropolitan of Kyiv, who had just regained his title of Metropolitan of Kyiv and all Russia (rather than the Metropolitan of Russia Minor and Lithuania) and on 6 March 1390 permanently moved to Muscovy.

In 1482, Poltava was razed by the Crimean Khan Mengli I Giray.

Early modern period

In 1537 Ografena Vasylivna Glinska (Baibuza) passed Poltava to her son-in-law Mykhailo Ivanovych Hrybunov-Baibuza.

After the Union of Lublin in 1569, the territory around Poltava became part of the Crown of Poland. In 1630 Poltava was passed to a Polish magnate, Bartholomew Obalkowski. In 1641 it changed ownership again, to Alexander Koniecpolski. In 1646 Poltava became part of Wiśniowiecki Ordynatsia (a large Wiśniowiecki estate in Left-bank Ukraine centered in Lubny), governed by the Ruthenian-Polish magnate Jeremi Wiśniowiecki (1612–51). 

In 1648, the city became the base of a distinguished regiment of Ukrainian Cossacks, and served as a Cossack stronghold during the Khmelnytsky Uprising. In 1650, to commemorate a victory of the Cossack Host over the Polish army at the Poltavka River, the Metropolitan of Kyiv, Sylvester Kossov, ordered the establishment of the monastery of the Exaltation of the Cross in Poltava. The project was financed by a number of prominent local residents, including Martyn Pushkar, Ivan Iskra, Ivan Kramar and many others.

During the 1654 Pereyaslav Council, the Poltava city delegates pledged their allegiance to the Czar of Muscovy, after which stolnik Andrei Spasitelev arrived in Poltava and recorded 1,335 residents who had pledged their allegiance. In 1658 Poltava became a center of anti-government revolt led by Martyn Pushkar, who contested the legitimacy of Ivan Vyhovsky's election to the post of Hetman of Zaporizhian Host. The uprising was extinguished with the help of Crimean Tatars. 

On the issue boyar Vasily Borisovich Sheremetev wrote to Alexei Mikhailovich on 8 June 1658: "... the Cherkas [Cossack] city of Poltava is ravaged and burned to the ground and only if the Great Sovereign orders to rebuilt on the Tatar Sokma (pathway) of Bakeyev Route and protect many his sovereign cities from Tatar visits. And if the Great Sovereign allows to place a voivode in the city and rebuilt the city until the fall that in Plotava Cherkasy [Cossacks] and residents built their houses and stock-piled their food". With the signing of the 1667 truce of Andrusovo, the city was finally subjected to the Tsardom of Muscovy, while remaining part of the Cossack Hetmanate.

The city suffered from the Great Turkish War when in 1695 Petro Ivanenko led an anti-Muscovite uprising with the help of Crimean Tatars, who ravaged the local monastery. The same year the Poltava Regiment actively participated in the Azov campaigns which resulted in the taking of the Turkish fortress of Kyzy-Kermen (today the city of Beryslav, Kherson Oblast). On 8 July (New Style) or 27 June (Old Style) 1709 the Battle of Poltava took place near the city during the Great Northern War. The battle ended in a decisive victory of Peter I of Russia over the Swedish forces and had great historical importance for the Russians. In 1710 there was a plague in the city and its surrounding area. In the mid-18th century the Kolomak Woods near Poltava became a base of haidamaks (Cossack paramilitary bands).

By 1770, Poltava had several brick factories, a regimental doctor, and a pharmacy; that same year the city conducted four fairs. In 1775 it became a city of Novorossiysk Governorate, guarded by the 8th Company of the Dnieper Pike Regiment headquartered in Kobeliaky. In 1775 Poltava's Monastery of the Exaltation of the Cross (Krestovozdvizhensky Monastyr) became the seat of bishops of the newly created Eparchy (Diocese) of Slaviansk and Kherson. This large new diocese included the lands of the Novorossiya Governorate and the Azov Governorate north of the Black Sea.

Since much of that area had only recently been seized from the Ottoman Empire by Russia, and a large number of Orthodox Greek settlers had been invited to settle in the region, the imperial government selected a renowned Greek scholar, Eugenios Voulgaris, to preside over the new diocese. After his retirement in 1779, he was replaced by another Greek theologian, Nikephoros Theotokis.

In 1779 the city established the Poltava county school, which became its first secular educational institution. In 1787 Catherine the Great stopped in Poltava on the way from Crimea, escorted by Grigori Potemkin, Alexander Suvorov and Mikhail Kutuzov. In Poltava, on 7 June 1787, before another Russo-Turkish War, Potemkin received his title "Prince of Taurida", while Suvorov received a snuffbox with monogram. In 1802 the city became the seat of the newly established Poltava Governorate. The city's population in 1802 consisted of some 8,000 residents. That same year Poltava opened a government-funded hospital of 20 beds.

19th century

On 2 February 1808, the Poltava Male Gymnasium was established. On 20 June 1808 some 54 families of craftsmen were invited to the city from German principalities and settled in the newly established German Sloboda neighborhood with about 50 clay-made houses. In 1810 there were 8,328 people living in Poltava; that same year, the city's first theater was built. In August 1812, on orders of Little Russia Governor General Lobanov-Rostovsky, the famed Ukrainian writer and statesman Ivan Kotlyarevsky formed the 5th Poltava Cavalry Cossack Regiment.

By 1860, Poltava had around 30,000 inhabitants, a district school, a gymnasium, an Institute for Noble Maidens, a spiritual academy, a cadet corps, a library and a number of schools. In 1870 a railway station was opened, leading to rapid economic growth in the region. However, by 1914 the Population of Poltava (around 60,000) was mostly working in small enterprises. In the late 19th and early 20th centuries Poltava became an important cultural centre, where many representatives of Ukrainian national revival were active.

20th century

During the events of 1917–1920, Poltava was under the rule of a number of governments, including the Central Rada, Hetmanate, Ukrainian People's Republic, White Movement and Bolsheviks. From 1918 to 1919 there was Occupation of Poltava by the Bolsheviks. After becoming a part of Ukrainian Soviet Socialist Republic, Poltava experienced accelerated industrial growth, and its population increased to 130,000 by 1939.

In World War II, the Nazi Wehrmacht occupied Poltava from 18 September 1941 until 23 September 1943, when it was retaken during the Chernigov-Poltava Strategic Offensive of the Battle of the Dnieper. During the Nazi occupation the Jewish population (9.9% of the total population in 1939) was imprisoned in a ghetto before being murdered during mass executions perpetrated by an Einsatzgruppe and buried in mass graves in the area. 

By the summer of 1944, the United States Army Air Forces conducted a number of shuttle bombing raids against Nazi Germany under the name of Operation Frantic. Poltava Air Base, as well as Myrhorod Air Base, were used as eastern locations for landing B-17 Flying Fortress heavy bombers involved in those operations.

The post-war restoration of Poltava continued in the 1950s and 1960s. The city became an important centre of military education in the Soviet Union, where missile and communications officers were prepared, and was also home to a Soviet Air Force division of heavy bombers.

Geography

Climate 
Poltava has a warm-summer humid continental climate (Köppen: Dfb), with four distinct seasons, it is one of the coldest cities in Ukraine. The annual precipitation is fairly evenly distributed, with the highest concentration in summer, and which falls as snow in winter.

Government and subdivisions

Poltava is the administrative center of the Poltava Oblast (province) as well as of the Poltava Raion housed within the city. However, Poltava is a city of oblast subordinance, thus being subject directly to the oblast authorities rather to the raion administration housed in the city itself.

Poltava's government consists of the 50-member Poltava City Council which is headed by the Secretary (currently Oleksandr Kozub). The city's current mayor is Oleksandr Mamay, who was sworn in on 4 November 2010 after being elected with more than 61 percent of the vote. In 2015 he was re-elected as a candidate of Conscience of Ukraine with 62.9% in a second round of Mayoral election.

The territory of Poltava is divided into 3 administrative raions (districts):
 Shevchenkivsky Raion, to the south-west with an area of 2077 hectares and a population of 147,600 in 2005. It's a largely residential area and includes the city centre.
 Kyivsky Raion, is the largest by area, comprising 5437 hectares, or 52.8% of the city total situated in the north and north-west. Its census in 2005 was 111,900. This district has a large industrial zone.
 Podilsky Raion, to the east and south-east, in the valley of the Vorskla river, with an area of 2988 hectares and a population of 53,700 in 2005.

The village of Rozsoshentsi, Scherbani, Tereshky, Kopyly and Suprunivka are officially considered to be outside the city, but constitute part of the Poltava agglomeration.

Culture

The centre of the old city is a semicircular Neoclassical square with the Tuscan column of cast iron (1805–11), commemorating the centenary of the Battle of Poltava and featuring 18 Swedish cannons captured in that battle. As Peter the Great celebrated his victory in the Saviour church, this 17th-century wooden shrine was carefully preserved to this day. The five-domed city cathedral, dedicated to the Exaltation of the Cross, is a superb monument of Cossack Baroque, built between 1699 and 1709. As a whole, the cathedral presents a unity which even the Neoclassical belltower has failed to mar. Another frothy Baroque church, dedicated to the Dormition of the Theotokos, was destroyed in 1934 and rebuilt in the 1990s.

A minor planet 2983 Poltava discovered in 1981 by Soviet astronomer Nikolai Stepanovich Chernykh is named after the city.

Sports

The most popular sport is football (soccer). Two professional football teams are based in the city: Vorskla Poltava in the Ukrainian Premier League and FC Poltava in the Second League.
There are 3 stadiums in Poltava: Butovsky Vorskla Stadium (main city stadium), Dynamo Stadium are situated in the city centre and Lokomotiv Stadium which is situated in Podil district.

Notable people

 Marie Bashkirtseff (1858–1884) Parisian painter and diarist.
 Yitzhak Ben-Zvi (1884–1963) historian, longest-serving President of Israel from 1952 to 1963.
 Hanka Bielicka (1915–2006) a Polish singer and actress, known by the name Hanna 
 Oleksandr Bilash (1931–2003) composer of lyric songs, ballads, operas, operettas and oratorios
 Sofya Bogomolets (1856–1892) a Russian revolutionary and political prisoner.
 Boris Brasol (1885-1963), lawyer and literary critic and a White Russian immigrant to the United States.
 Moura Budberg (1892–1974), a Russian adventuress and suspected double agent of OGPU & MI6.
 Nat Carr (1886–1944) an American character actor of the silent and early talking picture eras.
 Gregori Chmara (1878–1970) a stage and film actor whose career spanned six decades.
 Marusia Churai (1625–1653) a semi-mythical Ukrainian Baroque composer, poet, and singer.
 Andriy Danylko (born 1973) stage name Verka Serduchka; a Ukrainian comedian, actor, and singer.
 Sam Dreben (1878–1925), a highly decorated soldier in the US Army and a mercenary
 Vladimir Gajdarov (1893–1978) a Russian film actor and star of Russian and German silent cinema.
 Yuliy Ganf (1898–1973) a graphic artist, caricaturist, illustrator and poster designer.
 Nikolai Gogol (1809–1852), a novelist, short story writer and playwright.
 Alexander Gurwitsch (1874–1954) biologist and medical scientist; originated Morphogenetic field theory
 Oksana Ivanenko (1906-1997) – Ukrainian children's writer and translator
 Philip Jaffe (1895–1980) a left-wing American businessman, editor and author.
 Ernst Jedliczka (1855–1904) a Russian-German pianist, piano pedagogue, and music critic.
 Mykola Karpov (1929–2003), Ukrainian playwright.
 Dmitri Kessel (1902–1995), photojournalist, Life magazine 1944–1972 and war correspondent 
 Vera Kholodnaya (1893–1919) an actress of the early Imperial Russian cinema.
 Yuri Kondratyuk (1897–1942), astronautics and spaceflight pioneer; foresaw reaching the moon
 Ivan Kotliarevsky (1769–1838) a Ukrainian writer, poet and playwright and social activist
 Anatoly Lunacharsky (1875–1933) Russian Marxist revolutionary; Bolshevik Soviet people's Commissar
 Anton Makarenko (1888–1939), educator, social worker and writer and top educational theorist
 Yuri Levitin (1912–1993) a Soviet Russian composer of classical music.
 Mykola Lysenko (1842–1912) composer, pianist, conductor; founder first Ukrainian classical music school
 Patriarch Mstyslav (1898–1993), Ukrainian Orthodox Church hierarch
 Matvei Muranov (1873–1959) a Ukrainian Bolshevik revolutionary, Soviet politician and statesman.
 Panas Myrny (1849-1920) a Ukrainian prose writer and playwright
 Jensen Noen (born 1987) a Los Angeles-based filmmaker, cinematographer and writer. 
 Oleksiy Onyschenko (born 1933) a philosopher, academic and culture theorist
 Mikhail Ostrogradsky (1801–1862), a Ukrainian mathematician, mechanic and physicist
 Olena Pchilka (1849–1930), a Ukrainian publisher, writer, ethnographer and civil activist.
 Ivan Paskevich (1782-1856), Ukrainian military leader in Imperial Russian service.
 Symon Petliura (1879–1926) a Ukrainian politician, journalist and military leader of Ukraine's struggle for independence following the fall of the Russian Empire in 1917.
 Zhanna Prokhorenko (1940–2011) a Soviet and Russian actress
 Sasha Putrya (1977–1989) Ukrainian artist, died aged 11 from leukemia.
 Svitlana Pyrkalo (born 1976) a London-based writer, journalist and former BBC radio producer
 Boris Schwanwitsch (1889–1957) a Russian entomologist who specialised in Lepidoptera. 
 Moshe Zvi Segal (1904–1985), rabbi and activist in Israeli organizations, including Etzel and Lechi.
 Bert Shefter (1902–1999) a film composer who worked primarily in America.
 Avraham Shlonsky (1900–1973), Israeli poet and editor
 Hryhorii Skovoroda (1722–1794) a Ukrainian poet, philosopher and composer
 Ivan Steshenko (1873–1918), a Ukrainian civic and political activist, writer and Govt. minister.
 Maria Tarnowska (1877–1949), femme fatale, famously convicted of murder in Venice in 1910.
 Elias Tcherikower (1881–1943), a Jewish historian of Judaism and the Jewish people.
 Alina Treiger (born 1979) the first female rabbi to be ordained in Germany since WWII.
 Yelena Ubiyvovk (1918–1942) a partisan and leader of a Komsomol cell during WWII.
 Paisius Velichkovsky (1722–1794), Eastern Orthodox monk and theologian,  promoted staretsdom
 Nikolai Yaroshenko (1846–1898) a Ukrainian painter of portraits, genre paintings and drawings.

Sport 

 Leonid Bartenyev (1933–2021) a 100 metre team silver medallist at the 1956 and 1960 Summer Olympics
 Sergei Diyev (born 1958) a Russian football manager and former player with over 600 club caps
 Serhiy Konovalov (born 1972) a football coach and former footballer with 270 club caps and 22 for Ukraine
 Oleksandr Melaschenko (born 1978) a football striker with over 320 club caps and 16 for Ukraine
 Ruslan Rotan (born 1981) a former professional footballer with 382 club caps and 100 for Ukraine; now manager of the Ukraine national under-21 football team
 Ivan Shariy (born 1957) is a former Soviet and Ukrainian footballer with over 500 club caps

Economy and infrastructure

Transportation

Poltava's transportation infrastructure consists of two major train stations with railway links to Kyiv, Kharkiv, and Kremenchuk. Poltava's Kyiv line is electrified and is used by the Poltava Express. The electrification of the Poltava-Kharkiv line was completed in August 2008.

The Avtovokzal serves as the city's intercity bus station. Buses for local municipal routes depart from "AC-2" (autostation No. 2 – along Shevchenko street) and "AC-3" (Zinkivska street). Local municipal routes are parked along the Taras Shevchenko Street. Marshrutka minibuses serve areas where regular bus access is unavailable; however, they are privately owned and cost more per ride. In addition, a 10-route trolleybus network of  runs throughout the city. On the routes of the city go more than 50 units of trolleybuses.

Poltava is also served by an International Airport, situated outside the city limits near the village of Ivashky. The international highway M03, linking Poltava with Kyiv and Kharkiv, passes through the southern outskirts of the city. There is also a regional highway P-17 crossing Poltava and linking it with Kremenchuk and Sumy.

Education

Poltava has always been one of the most important science and education centres in Ukraine. Major universities and institutions of higher education include the following:

 Poltava National Pedagogical University  named after V. G. Korolenko
 National University "Yuri Kondratyuk Poltava Polytechnic"
 Poltava Agrarian State Academy
 Poltava State Medical University
 Poltava University of Economics and Trade
 Poltava Military Institute of Connections
 Poltava Law Institute of Yaroslav Mudryi National Law University 
Poltava branch of the State Academy of Statistics, region and audit to the State Statistics Committee of Ukraine

Astronomy
 Poltava gravimetric observatory (PGO) is situated a bit north from city centre (27–29 Miasoyedov St.). Its main work directions are measurements of Earth rotation, latitude variations (applying zenith stars observations, lunar occultation observations and other)
 Observational station of PGO in rural area, some 20 km east along the M03-E40 highway. Radiotelescope URAN-2 (Ukrainian: УРАН-2) is situated there too.

International relations

 
Poltava is twinned with:
  Veliko Tarnovo, Bulgaria (1963)
  Filderstadt, Germany
  Ostfildern, Germany
  Irondequoit, United States
  Kristianstad, Sweden

Gallery

References

External links

 
 
 
 
 
 
 
 The murder of the Jews of Poltava during World War II, at Yad Vashem website.

 
Cities in Poltava Oblast
Poltavsky Uyezd
Kiev Voivodeship
Cossack Hetmanate
Cities of regional significance in Ukraine
Holocaust locations in Ukraine
Oblast centers in Ukraine
Populated places established in the 9th century